This is a list of television programs currently and formerly broadcast by Discovery Kids in India.The channel was launched on 7 August 2012.

Current programming 
 Bablu Dablu
 Bunty Billa Aur Babban
 Fukrey Boyzzz
 Kisna
 Little Singham Roll No 21 Sheikh Chilli and Friendz Former programming 

 1001 Nights Adiboo Adventures Adventure 8: Zoo Games Animal Atlas Art NinjaBindi the Jungle Girl Care Bears The Adventures of Chuck and Friends The Adventures of Tintin 
 Akbar and Birbal The Amazing Spiez! Angry Birds Blues Piggy Tales Angry Birds Stella Angry Birds Toons Bandbudh Aur Budbak Bump Chaplin & Co ChimpuiClassmate Spell Bee Clifford the Big Red Dog Dex Hamilton: Alien EntomologistDick 'N' Dom Go WildDino DanDiscovery School Super League Dinofroz DokiFinding Stuff Out Gadget Boy G.I. Joe: Renegades Howzzattt Kim Insectibles Legend of Enyo Little Krishna Luv Kushh Maya the BeeMister MakerMystery Hunters India Molly of Denali The Mysteries of Alfred Hedgehog Nature Cat The Monster Kid The New Woody Woodpecker Show Pinkalicious & Peterrific Nils Holgersson Oscar's Oasis Papyrus Robin Hood: Mischief in Sherwood Sally Bollywood 
 Shaktimaan: The Animated Series Sunny Bunnies Tenali Raman Transformers: Animated Transformers: Armada Transformers: Cybertron Transformers: Cyberverse Transformers: Energon Transformers: Prime Transformers: Rescue Bots Wild Kratts The Woody Woodpecker Show Tiny Toon AdventuresWild Tales Zak Storm''

References 

Lists of Indian television series